Kyabje Nawang Gehlek Rimpoche was a Tibetan Buddhist lama born in Lhasa, Tibet on October 26, 1939. His personal name was Gelek; kyabje and rimpoche are titles meaning "teacher" (lit., "lord of refuge") and "precious," respectively; he is known to Tibetans as Nyakre Khentrul Rinpoche.  He was a tulku, an incarnate lama of Drepung Monastic University, where he received the highest scholastic degree of Geshe Lharampa, equivalent to a PhD, at the exceptionally young age of 20.  His father was the 10th Demo Rinpoche and his uncle was the 13th Dalai Lama, Thubten Gyatso. 

He was educated alongside the 14th Dalai Lama, Tenzin Gyatso who said "he completed his traditional Buddhist training as a monk in Tibet prior to the Chinese Takeover." Rimpoche was tutored by many of Tibet's greatest teachers including the 14th Dalai Lama's senior and junior tutors, Kyabje Ling Rinpoche and Kyabje Trijang Rinpoche, who sent him to the West to teach, and Denma Locho Rinpoche and Song Rinpoche. 

According to Thupten Jinpa, principal English translator to the Dalai Lama, he is considered  

In 1959, ten days after the Dalai Lama fled to India, Gelek Rimpoche led a large group of Tibetans from Tibet into exile in India.  

He then settled at a temporary camp with other lamas and monks in Buxa, India, where his education continued, although "there were no books, and classes had to be taught from memory only." He was one of the first students of the Young Lamas Home School and later gave up monastic life. He was named director of Tibet House in New Delhi, India in 1965. In the 1970s he served as head of Tibetan services and as a radio host at All India Radio.  He preserved over 170 volumes of rare Tibetan manuscripts that would have otherwise been lost and conducted over 1000 interviews, compiling an oral history of the fall of Tibet to Communist China that are in the US Library of Congress's Tibetan Oral History Archive Project. In 1964 he was an exchange student at Cornell University. 

Rimpoche moved to Ann Arbor, Michigan in 1987 to teach Buddhism. In 1988 he founded and was president of Jewel Heart, a nonprofit "spiritual, cultural, and humanitarian organization that translates the ancient wisdom of Tibetan Buddhism into contemporary life." in Ann Arbor, which has expanded to Bloomfield Hills, Michigan, Chicago, Cleveland, Nebraska, New York, Malaysia and The Netherlands. Beat-poet Allen Ginsberg was among the more prominent of Jewel Heart's members. Ginsberg met with Gelek Rinpoche through the modern composer Philip Glass in 1989. Allen and Philip jointly staged benefits for the Jewel Heart organization.  Professor Robert Thurman, Joe Liozzo, and Glenn Mullin are also Jewel Heart members and frequent lecturers. He became an American citizen in July 1994. Demo Rinpoche, Rimpoche's nephew, has served as Jewel Heart’s Resident Spiritual Director since 2018.

Gelek Rinpoche died on February 15, 2017, in Ann Arbor, Michigan, after undergoing surgery the previous month.

In 2021 Tibet House US in New York City partnered with the Allen Ginsberg estate and Jewel Heart International on "Transforming Minds: Kyabje Gelek Rimpoche and Friends," a gallery and eventually online exhibition of images of Rimpoche by Allen Ginsberg, with whom he had an  “indissoluble bond.” "Fifty negatives guided by Allen’s extensive notes on the contact sheets and images he’d circled with the intention to print," featured images including Rimpoche "with other great Tibetan masters, including Ribur Rimpoche and Khylogla Rato Rimpoche, images we had not known about." Other images include Rimpoche with "monks, Tibetologists, friends, and students, including Philip Glass, artist Francesco Clemente, founder of Tibet House US, Robert Thurman, poet Anne Waldman, and songwriter, singer, and poet, Patti Smith."

Selected bibliography
Good Life, Good Death: Tibetan Wisdom on Reincarnation, (foreword by His Holiness the Dalai Lama), Riverhead Books, 2001, 
The Tara Box: Rituals for Protection and Healing From the Female Buddha (with Brenda Rosen), New World Library, 2004, 
Essentials of Modern Literary Tibetan: A Reading Course and Reference Grammar (with Melvyn C. Goldstein, Lobsang Phuntshog),  University of California Press, 1991, 
A History of Modern Tibet, Vol. 1 1913-1951, (with Melvyn C Goldstein), University of California Press, 2008, 
A History of Modern Tibet, Vol. 2, The calm before the storm, 1951-1955, (with Melvyn C Goldstein), University of California Press, 2009,  
How the Mind Works, Jewel Heart, 2016, 
Perfection of Wisdom: An Essential Explanation of the Mantra and the Five Paths, 2014, 
The Three Principles of the Path: A Brief Explanation, Jewel Heart, 2014, 
Shantideva's Guide to the Bodhisattva's Way of Life: Chapter 3; Full Acceptance of the Awakening Mind, Jewel Heart, 2013, 
37 Wings of Change, Jewel Heart, 2012, 
Shantideva's Guide to the Bodhisattva's Way of Life: Chapter 6; Patience, Jewel Heart, 2010, 
The Four Mindfulnesses: On the Basis of a Poem by the Seventh Dalai Lama with Commentary by Kyabje Ling Rinpoche, Jewel Heart, 2009, 
The Four Noble Truths, Jewel Heart, 2009, 
Shantideva's Guide to the Bodhisattva's Way of Life: Chapter 7; Enthusiasm, Jewel Heart, 2008, 
GOM: A Course In Meditation, Jewel Heart, 2005, 
Lam Rim: Foundations of the Path, Jewel Heart, 2005, 
Transforming Negativities, Jewel Heart, 2004, 
 Catalogue : first exhibition in new Tibet House, (with Gyaltsen Yeshey, Nicholas Ribush, Trisha Donnelly); Tibet House, New Delhi, India), 1979, OCLC Number: 37437276

References

External links
 Biography of Gelek Rimpoche, from Jewel Heart
 Remembering Gelek Rimpoche, from Jewel Heart
 Gelek Rimpoche White Tara Guided Meditation, Gelek Rimpoche leads a guided meditation on the healing and compassionate activity of Tara.
 Enlightenment in Female Form, by Gelek Rimpoche, Lion's Roar, February 17, 2017
 Gelek Rimpoche author's page, Lion's Roar
 Big Love: Gelek Rimpoche on Dharma in the West, 1982 interview by Robyn Brentano, Lama Yeshe Wisdom Archive, FPMT

American Rimpoche  documentary film about the life of Gelek Rimpoche
"Rubin Museum Show to Trace Francesco Clemente's Indian Inspirations" New York Times article describes Francesco Clemente's "series Clemente x 8, a group of 90-minute discussions between Clemente and eight people he regards as masters in other fields: the musicians Patti Smith and Nas; the chef Eric Ripert; the directors Alfonso Cuarón, Robert Lepage and David Chase; the architect Billie Tsien; and Gelek Rimpoche, a Tibetan Buddhist lama to whom Mr. Clemente is particularly close."

1939 births
2017 deaths
Lamas from Tibet
Gelug Lamas
Tibetan writers
Tibetan Buddhism writers
Gelug tulkus
American people of Tibetan descent
Tibetan Buddhists from Tibet
Rinpoches
20th-century lamas
21st-century lamas